Raymond Albert Nolting (November 8, 1913 – July 5, 1995) was an American football halfback for the Chicago Bears of the National Football League (NFL), as well as a college football head coach. He played college football at the University of Cincinnati, before spending six seasons with the Bears. He rushed for over 2,000 yards, and had over 500 receiving yards before retiring in 1943. He was a member of Chicago Bears NFL Championship teams in 1940, 1941 and 1943 and selected to the Pro Bowl twice. In the 1940 Bears' 73–0 rout of the Washington Redskins, Nolting rushed for 68 yards and a touchdown and intercepted a Sammy Baugh pass. From 1945 to 1948, he coached at Cincinnati, where he compiled a 23–15–1 record.

College career 
While at the University of Cincinnati, the football team compiled a record of 20-6-1 and won two Buckeye Conference titles in 1934 and 1935. While individual statistics are virtually nonexistent, reports credit Nolting with fifteen 200-plus yards rushing games during his three-year varsity career. Ray was named All Buckeye Conference in 1934 and 1935. After the 1935 season, Ray was named All Ohio (team captain) and was an All American honorable mention.

Nolting was the first UC football player to make the All American team and to go on to play professional football. He had the reputation of being a hard-nosed runner, fierce competitor, an explosive runner and a true triple threat. Run. Pass. Kick.

In addition to playing football for the Bearcats, Ray playing basketball his senior year and was on the track and field team in 1933–1935.

NFL career 
One story had it Ray joined the Bears so he could play with Bronko Nagurski and not against him. The wisdom of this move was confirmed in the first Bear scrimmage, when he found himself on the opposite team from the Bronk. While Nolting was a virtual unknown in Chicago, early in his rookie year he proved his value. Nolting got his first chance to start in the second Packer/Bear game In '36. Beattie Feathers hurt his ankle and Ray was sent into the game. The Bears ran an of-tackle play and Bronk (Bronko Nagurski) made about 15 yards. Nolting blocked and knocked down the Packer's Hall of Fam linebacker Clarke Hinkle to lead the play. Bronk came back to the huddle and said "anyone who could knock that Hinkle on his ass can play on my first team." "Halas always listened to Bronk. Anything Bronko wanted... Bronko got. From that time on, I was a first string player." recalled Nolting in a 1985 interview.

While Nolting was used primarily for his blocking skills to lead the way for the likes of Bronko Nagurski, Sid Luckman, Bill Osmanski and George McAfee, Ray was a vital member of three World Championship teams (1940, 1941, and 1943) and five divisional championship teams. Playing in a galaxy of all-time NFL greats, Nolting was elected MVP three times. In 1937, Ray was an honorable mention on the All-Pro team and was named the league's “fastest starting back” and “best quick kicker”.

In 1940, the year the Bears beat the Washington Redskins 73–0 in the World Championship game, Nolting lead the Bears in total yards and had intercepted four passes. Nolting was also a big member of the 1942 team which was undefeated during the regular season (11-0) only to be upset by the Washington Redskins 14–6 in the championship game.

During Nolting's eight-year career, the Chicago Bears amasses a record of 73 wins, 19 losses and two ties – a 77.6% winning percentage. The Bears were the only team to win two more World Championships over the next 20 seasons.

In all, Ray was named team MVP three times. Nolting was All-Pro leading his teams to an overall record of 69-17-2 with an 89% winning percentage. Nolting's teams won 5 Western Division Championships and were World Champions In 1940, 1941 and 1943.

College coaching career 
Nolting was hired to revive the University of Cincinnati football program after the conclusion of World War II. Manned with many veterans of the armed services, he quickly put the program back together. In four seasons, they compiled a 23-15-1 record.

Nolting had his own style; fairly fundamental with strong offensive play combined with a hard-nosed defense like the Bears.

Of Nolting, the team captain of the 1946 Bearcats, Elbie Nickel, said, "He was a tough couch and insisted on long practices and repetitive drills, but he wasn't above getting into the action with his team. He wasn't much older than we were... so he could show us what to do. He was a young couch and he did a great job for us. Of course, he had a little temper and he's get a bit excited on the sidelines."

The 1946 team has been ranked as one of the university's best ever with victories over Big Ten Champion Indiana (15-7) and Michigan State while compiling an 8–2 record.

The 1946 Bearcats were league champions and appeared in UC's first bowl game. At that time, there were only five bowl games. UC played in the Sun Bowl in El Paso, Texas, defeating Virginia Tech 18–6.

Head coaching record

References

External links
 
 raynolting.com

1913 births
1995 deaths
American football halfbacks
Cincinnati Bearcats football coaches
Cincinnati Bearcats football players
Chicago Bears players
Coaches of American football from Ohio
Players of American football from Cincinnati